The WTO General Council held an eighth WTO ministerial conference session in Geneva from 15–3 December 2011.

Membership agreement were made for Russia, Samoa, and Montenegro, dependent on the ratification of those countries. The consent of Russia`s membership was seen as important, since the country had been the largest major economy outside the organization since the accession of China in 2001.

References

World Trade Organization ministerial conferences
2011 in Switzerland
Diplomatic conferences in Switzerland
21st-century diplomatic conferences
2011 in international relations
History of Geneva
21st century in Geneva
December 2011 events in Europe